Sasha Caleb Victorine (born February 3, 1978 in Santa Ana, California) is an American former soccer player.

He spent his entire professional career in Major League Soccer in the United States, making over 100 appearances for both Los Angeles Galaxy and Kansas City Wizards, before finishing his career with Chivas USA. He also made four appearances and scored one goal for the United States national team, and represented his country at the 2000 Summer Olympics.

Career

Youth and College
Victorine played high school soccer at Rio Americano High School, and college soccer at UCLA, leading them to the NCAA title in 1997, and being named a first-team All-American in 1999. He was drafted by the Los Angeles Galaxy in the first round of the 2000 MLS SuperDraft.

Professional
Victorine spent five years with LA, winning the U.S. Open Cup in 2001 and the MLS Cup in 2002; his best season was 2001, when he scored seven goals and five assists. He was traded to Kansas City Wizards for a draft pick in 2005. Alternating between the attack and midfield, in six years in MLS, he scored 24 goals and 24 assists, adding four goals and two assists in the playoffs. Victorine was traded to Chivas USA on September 15, 2008, in return for allocation money.  He retired from professional soccer in March 2010.  He currently works in the Kansas City Wizards front office and also serves as a commentator on KCWE television station.

Throughout his career at UCLA, the Galaxy, and the US Olympic and national teams, Victorine was teammates with Peter Vagenas. The two Californians were born just four days apart.  Sasha retired from professional soccer in March 2010.  Since that time he has worked as a commentator for the Kansas City Wizards / Sporting Kansas City games on the KCWE & KSMO television stations respectively and is currently working in the role of Membership Development for Sporting Kansas City.

International
Victorine played for the United States in the 1999 Pan American Games and the 2000 Summer Olympics. He earned his first cap for the senior national team on October 25, 2000 against Mexico, and earned four caps total, scoring one goal. An attacking player for most of his career, US coach Bruce Arena played Victorine at right back.

Sports diplomacy 
In November 2010, Victorine traveled to Cyprus as a SportsUnited Sports Envoy for the U.S. Department of State. In this function, he worked with Anthony Sanneh to conduct basketball clinics and events for 350 youth from underserved areas. In so doing, Victorine helped contribute to SportsUnited's mission to promote greater international understanding and inclusion through sport.

References

External links
 MLS player profile

1978 births
Living people
American soccer players
UCLA Bruins men's soccer players
United States men's international soccer players
Olympic soccer players of the United States
Footballers at the 2000 Summer Olympics
Soccer players from California
Major League Soccer players
LA Galaxy players
Sporting Kansas City players
Chivas USA players
United States men's youth international soccer players
United States men's under-20 international soccer players
United States men's under-23 international soccer players
LA Galaxy draft picks
Association football midfielders
Pan American Games bronze medalists for the United States
Pan American Games medalists in football
All-American men's college soccer players
Footballers at the 1999 Pan American Games
Medalists at the 1999 Pan American Games